Anthony Hamilton Millard Kirk-Greene CMG MBE (16 May 1925 – 8 July 2018) was a British historian and ethnographer best known for his works on Nigerian history and the history of British colonial administration in Africa. After a career as a colonial official, Kirk-Greene became a fellow of St Antony's College, Oxford, where he was lecturer in the modern history of Africa from 1967 to 1992. He was president of the African Studies Association of the UK from 1988 to 1990 and vice-president of the Royal African Society.

Biography
Anthony Kirk-Greene was born in Tunbridge Wells in Kent, England on 16 May 1925. He served as a captain in the Indian Army from 1943 to 1947 during World War II. He later graduated from Cambridge University in 1950 and in 1954 with Bachelor and Masters of Arts degrees. He also obtained a Master of Arts from Oxford University in 1967.

Kirk-Greene joined the Colonial Service, serving as an administrator in Nigeria and eventually rising to the rank of Senior District Commissioner. During this time, he became interested in ethnography and Hausa culture and language. After Nigerian independence, he was a  senior lecturer at Ahmadu Bello University at Zaria, Kaduna State from 1961 to 1965. From 1967 to 1981 he was professor of history at St Antony's College, Oxford. He was adjunct professor from 1992 to 1999 at the Stanford Program at Oxford. He wrote a number of well-received works on Nigerian history and the Nigerian Civil War as well as the political science of post-independence Africa more generally. He also wrote a number of important studies on the history of the Colonial Service.

He was president of the African Studies Association of the United Kingdom (ASAUK) from 1998 to 1990 and was awarded ASAUK's "Distinguished Africanist" award in 2005. He died in Oxford on 8 July 2018 at the age of 93.

Selected works
 This is Northern Nigeria : background to an invitation. (1956)
 The capitals of Northern Nigeria. (1957)
 Adamawa, past and present; an historical approach to the development of a northern Cameroons province. (1958) 
 Maiduguri and the capitals of Bornu. Maiduguri da manyan biranen Barno. (1958)
 The principles of native administration in Nigeria; selected documents, 1900-1947. (1965)
 Hausa ba dabo ba ne; a collection of 500 proverbs. (1966) 
 A modern Hausa reader. With Yahaya Aliyu. (1967)
 West African travels and adventures; two autobiographical narratives from Northern Nigeria. (1971) 
 Crisis and conflict in Nigeria: a documentary sourcebook. (1971) 
 The genesis of the Nigerian civil war and the theory of fear. (1975) 
 A biographical dictionary of the British colonial governor. (1980) 
 "Stay by your radios" : documentation for a study of military government in tropical Africa. (1981) 
 Nigeria since 1970 : a political and economic outline. (1981) 
 A biographical dictionary of the British Colonial Service, 1939-1966. (1991) 
 On crown service : a history of HM colonial and overseas civil services, 1837-1997. (1999) 
 Britain's imperial administrators, 1858-1966.  (2000) 
 Symbol of authority : the British district officer in Africa. (2006) 
 Glimpses of empire : a Corona anthology. (2012) 
 Aspects of empire : a second Corona anthology. (2012)

References

External links
Anthony Kirk-Greene Memorial at the African Studies Centre (University of Oxford)

1925 births
2018 deaths
Academic staff of Ahmadu Bello University
Ahmadu Bello University people
Alumni of the University of Cambridge
Alumni of the University of Oxford
Historians of Nigeria
People from Royal Tunbridge Wells
British Indian Army officers
Colonial Service officers
Companions of the Order of St Michael and St George
English Africanists
Fellows of St Antony's College, Oxford
Presidents of the African Studies Association of the United Kingdom